Japan–Malta relations refers to bilateral foreign relations between Japan and Malta. Their diplomatic relations were established in 1965. 

Malta has an embassy in Tokyo since September 28, 2020. On the other hand, Japan's embassy in Rome, Italy, is accredited to Malta, while it is represented in Valletta by an honorary consulate.

History 

During the last two years of World War I, Japan played an important role in securing the sea lanes. Fourteen destroyers on anti-submarine convoy escort duty and their flagship cruisers of the Imperial Japanese Navy made Malta their homeport. The destroyer  was torpedoed by the Austrian submarine U-27 on June 11, 1917 killing 68 of her crew. They were buried in Kalkara Naval Cemetery in Malta.

On September 21, 1964, the State of Malta, whose successor state is the modern-day Republic of Malta, became independent from the United Kingdom. In the next year, 1965, Japan established formal diplomatic relations with Malta.

In the beginning of 1989, on the occasion of the death and funeral of Hirohito, the 124th Emperor of Japan who had ruled for over 60 years until he died on January 7, Maltese Foreign Minister Ċensu Tabone and Private Secretary Adrian Camilleri flew from Valletta to Tokyo and Maltese Ambassador Victor J. Gauci flew from Canberra to Tokyo, to attend the Rites of Imperial Funeral at the Imperial Palace in Tokyo on February 24.

In July 2006, Japanese Ex-prime Minister Toshiki Kaifu paid a courtesy call on Maltese President Eddie Fenech Adami in Valletta.

On May 27, 2017, Maltese Prime Minister Joseph Muscat welcomed Japanese Prime Minister Shinzō Abe, who came to the capital of Malta, and there held a joint press conference.

Further reading
"Enhancing Relations between Japan and Malta". The Malta Independent. 28 July 2005.
Martina Borg. "Malta Looks Forward to Stronger Trade, Diplomatic Relations with Japan. Malta Today. 20 November 2015.
"Japan eyes Malta's success at Tourism". The Times of Malta. 20 November 2015.
"Maltese-Japanese Negotiations for Greater Commercial Interaction" . TVM (Television Malta). 20 November 2015.
"Maltese Community found in Japan dates back 100 Years". The Malta Independent. 9 June 2015.
Jackson, Lewis and Matsushita. Implementing the Tokyo Round: National Constitutions and International Economic Rules. University of Michigan Press. 1984. Page 84. Google Books
Louis Jerold Adams. Theory, Law and Policy of Contemporary Japanese Treaties. Oceana Publications. 1974. Pages 172, 237 and 269. Google Books
Trade agreement between the Government of Malta and the Government of Japan done at Tokyo on 13 November 1968 (Treaty Series No. 110; 1968 Joyaku-shu 327)

References

External links
 Embassy of Japan to Malta
 Embassy of Malta in Tokyo
 
 

 
Bilateral relations of Malta
Malta